George Arthur Barlow (1914–unknown) was an English professional footballer who played in the Football League for Mansfield Town.

References

1914 births
Date of death unknown
English footballers
Association football defenders
English Football League players
Mansfield Town F.C. players
Langwith Miners Welfare F.C. players